The 1999 Advanta Championships of Philadelphia was a women's tennis tournament played on indoor hard courts in Philadelphia, United States. It was part of Tier II of the 1999 WTA Tour. It was the 17th edition of the tournament and was held from November 8 through November 14, 1999. Second-seeded Lindsay Davenport won the singles title and earned $80,000 first-prize money.

Entrants

Seeds

Other entrants
The following players received wildcards into the singles main draw:
  Justine Henin
  Kim Clijsters
  Cara Black

The following players received wildcards into the doubles main draw:
  Kim Clijsters /  Justine Henin

The following players received entry from the singles qualifying draw:

  Jill Craybas
  Marissa Irvin
  María Vento
  Dája Bedáňová

The following players received entry as lucky losers:
  Seda Noorlander

The following players received entry from the doubles qualifying draw:

  Sandra Cacic /  Lilia Osterloh

Finals

Singles

 Lindsay Davenport defeated  Martina Hingis, 6–3, 6–4
 This was Davenport's twenty-fifth WTA title of her career, and sixth of the year.

Doubles

 Lisa Raymond /  Rennae Stubbs defeated  Chanda Rubin /  Sandrine Testud, 6–1, 7–6(7–2)

External links
 ITF tournament edition details
 Tournament draws

Advanta Championships of Philadelphia
Advanta Championships of Philadelphia
Advanta Championships of Philadelphia
Advanta Championships of Philadelphia
Advanta Championships of Philadelphia